Barsuanbashevo (Bärśewänbaş) is a rural locality (a selo) in Novotroitsky Selsoviet, Chishminsky District, Bashkortostan, Russia. The population was 265 as of 2010. There are 6 streets.

Geography 
Barsuanbashevo is located 27 km southeast of Chishmy (the district's administrative centre) by road. Novosayranovo is the nearest rural locality.

References 

Rural localities in Chishminsky District